The Leicester Panthers were a British American Football team that played in the BAFA National Leagues, formed in 1984 and disbanded in 1996 who played home games at Saffron Lane sports centre.  In the time they played, they recorded only one losing season, and won the league final in 1996, the year they dissolved the team. The club can boast New Orleans Saints head coach Sean Payton as their most famous alumnus, as he was the starting quarterback in the 1988 season.

A number of original players from the Leicester Panthers, including rugby star Martin Johnson, who had played for the team in the early 1990s, Barry Driver, Charles Thompson and Neil Eastoll, reformed in 2007 to play a charity match against the Loughborough Aces for the Matt Hampson Trust; the Panthers won 20-3.

In 2008 a number of ex-panther players were part of the squad that formed Leicester's current British American Football team, the Leicester Falcons.

See also
Leicester Falcons - Leicester's current American Football club.

References

External links 
 Leicester Panthers Cheerleading Squad website on Archive.org
 BAFA Community Leagues website

Sport in Leicester